Amédé Ardoin (March 11, 1898 – November 3, 1942) was an American Creole musician, known for his high singing voice and virtuosity on the Cajun accordion. He is credited by Louisiana music scholars with laying the groundwork for both Creole and Cajun music in the early 20th century, and wrote several songs now regarded as Cajun and zydeco standards.

Early life and career
Ardoin was born near Basile in Evangeline Parish, Louisiana a descendant of both enslaved and free people. Ardoin spoke only Cajun French and did not speak English, as did most people in the Cajun Country. Developing his musical talents in preference to undertaking farm work, he played at dances, often for Cajun audiences, with fiddle players Alphonse LaFleur and Douglas Bellard. He moved around the area frequently, settling at one point near Chataignier, where he met Cajun fiddle player Dennis McGee. They established a more regular musical partnership, playing at local house parties, sometimes attended by Ardoin's young cousin, Alphonse "Bois Sec" Ardoin.

Ardoin and McGee were among the first artists to record the music of the Acadiana region of Louisiana. On December 9, 1929, they recorded six songs for Columbia Records in New Orleans. They made further recordings together in New Orleans in 1930, and in San Antonio, Texas, in August 1934. Ardoin also made solo recordings in New York City in December 1934. The recordings were issued on various labels, including Brunswick, Vocalion, Decca, Melotone and Bluebird. In all, thirty-four recordings with Ardoin playing accordion are known to exist.

His recordings and performances became popular throughout southern Louisiana. In the late 1930s, he played regularly in Eunice, Louisiana with fiddle player Sady Courville, but the two did not record together. Ardoin's music combined "European song forms and African rhythmic approaches such as swing and syncopation... [He] personified this cultural blend and enhanced its development through his deft technique and his ability to improvise. Ardoin was a lively, inventive accordionist who could keep a crowd dancing while playing alone. He was also a soulful singer whose emotional style made dramatic use of elongated, high-pitched notes."

Later life and death
The circumstances that led to Ardoin's death, and the final cause of his death, were uncertain for many years. 

Contemporaries said that Ardoin suffered from impaired mental and musical capacities later in his life. 

Descendants of family members and musicians who knew Ardoin claimed a story, now well-known, about a racially motivated attack on him in which he was severely beaten, in about 1939, while walking home after playing at a house dance near Eunice. The common story said that some white men were angered when a white woman, daughter of the house, lent her handkerchief to Ardoin to wipe the sweat from his face. 

Another story according to musicians Canray Fontenot and Wade Frugé, in PBS's American Patchwork, claimed that as Ardoin was leaving Eunice, he was run over by a Model A car which crushed his head and throat, damaging his vocal cords; they said he was found the next day, lying in a ditch.

Studies have concluded that he died as a result of a venereal disease. He ended up in an asylum in Pineville, Louisiana, where he was admitted in September 1942. He died at the hospital two months later, and was buried in the hospital's common grave.

Legacy 
On March 11, 2018, a life-sized statue of Ardoin was unveiled at the St. Landry Parish Visitor Center—based on the only known photo of Ardoin, when he received the Catholic sacrament of Confirmation. The project was headed by Louisiana's former Poet Laureate, author, and professor Darrell Bourque, who wrote a book of poetry titled 'If You Abandon Me: An Amédé Ardoin Songbook', the cover of which features artwork by Pierre Bourque.

Discography

Compilations
Amadé Ardoin – Louisiana Cajun Music Vol. 6 : Amadé Ardoin – The First Black Zydeco Recording Artist (1928–1938) (OT-124 Old Timey Records, 1983)
Pioneers of Cajun Accordion 1926–1936 (LPOT128 Old Timey / Arhoolie, 1989)
I'm Never Comin Back: Roots of Zydeco (ARH7007 Arhoolie, 1995)
Amede Ardoin – Mama, I'll Be Long Gone: The Complete Recordings of Amede Ardoin 1929–1934 (TSQ2554 Tompkins Square Records, 2011)

See also
History of Cajun Music
List of Notable People Related to Cajun Music

References

External links
 Amédé Ardoin: From sad songs to home statue 
 if you abandon me, comment je vas faire: An Amédé Ardoin Songbook (#1) 
 if you abandon me, comment je vas faire: An Amédé Ardoin Songbook (#2) 
 Amédé Ardoin & Dennis McGee: Blues du Basile Listen
 I'm Never Coming Back on Arhoolie records
 
 American Roots Music (PBS)
 Louisiana Folklife Program select musician biographies
 

1898 births
1942 deaths
Creole accordionists
Louisiana Creole people
Zydeco accordionists
American folk musicians
Musicians from Louisiana
Cajun accordionists
Deaths in mental institutions
20th-century American musicians
People from Basile, Louisiana
20th-century accordionists
African-American Catholics